This is a list of the Palestine national under-23 football team results from 2002 to present.

Results

2002

2003

2006

2007

2009

2010

2011

2012

2013

2014

2015

2016

2018

2019

2021

2022

References

2020s in the State of Palestine
u23